Tabor College may refer to:

 Tabor College (Iowa), a defunct institution formerly located in Iowa
 Tabor College (Kansas), a four-year Christian liberal arts institution in Kansas
 Tabor College, Australia

See also
 Tabor Academy (disambiguation)